The Ross Memorial Church is a Uniting Church building on Hay Street in West Perth, Western Australia.

History 
Five years prior to the construction of the church a brick hall (designed by Andrew Oswald Wilson) was built adjacent to the church's site, as the congregation was growing too large for their earlier Havelock Street hall, where they had been for nearly 17 years. That earlier site was sold to the Catholic community, and the Hay Street land purchased from them for the purpose of constructing a church, hall, and manse.

The church is named after Daniel Ross, who was minister of the West Perth Presbyterian congregation until his death in 1917. It was completed in 1917 at a total construction cost of £4,147.

The architect for the project was James Hine, FRIBA, and the building contractor was R. A. Gamble. It was built in the Federation Gothic revival style. The church contains a pipe organ chamber with case, and display pipes arranged in 3 towers.

Senator Agnes Robertson was a longtime member of the church, teaching the girls' Bible class and becoming one of the first women to serve as a lay preacher.

Plaques on the walls describe the dedication and West Perth Heritage Trail text:

Dedication

   This stone was laid 
  by the Right Honourable 
  Sir John Forrest 
  P.C., G.C.M.G., L.L.D.. 
  Assisted by Lady Forrest 
  15th July 1916.
 

      James Hine, F.R.I.B.A., 
   Architect
 
    R. A. Gamble,
   Contractor

Heritage trail

      The West Perth Presbyterian Church was first 
   established in Havelock Street in 1898.  However, as the 
   congregation swelled during the gold boom years of the 
   1890s and early 1900s, it was found to be too small.  
   The Ross Memorial Church was built during the First 
   World War (1914 - 18), largely as a result of the efforts of 
   the Reverend Ross, who died only a few months after its 
   completion in 1917.

Present day
As well as services, the church is used for community functions and weddings.

The church is currently the home of the Wesley worshipping community of the Uniting Church in the City, part of the Uniting Church in Australia 

It is currently listed with the Heritage Council of Western Australia, as Heritage Place No. 2235.

Gallery

References

External links

Churches in Perth, Western Australia
Heritage places in Perth, Western Australia
Landmarks in Perth, Western Australia
Uniting churches in Western Australia
Hay Street, Perth